This article lists notable socialist economists and political economists.

Classical economists
 Ferdinand Lassalle
 John Stuart Mill (later work)

Ricardian economists
 John Francis Bray
 John Gray
 Charles Hall
 Thomas Hodgskin

Utopian socialists
 Charles Fourier
 Robert Owen
 Saint-Simon

Anarchist economists
 Mikhail Bakunin
 Joseph Proudhon
 Benjamin Tucker

Marxian economists
 Paul Cockshott
 James Connolly
 Friedrich Engels
 Rudolf Hilferding
 Andrew Kliman
 Nikolai Kondratiev
 János Kornai
 Rosa Luxemburg
 Ernest Mandel
 Karl Marx
 Antonie Pannekoek
 Karl Polanyi
 Robert Rowthorn
 Richard D. Wolff
 Michael Hudson
 Yanis Varoufakis

Marxian-Sraffian
 David Laibman
 Nobuo Okishio
 John Roemer
 Anwar Shaikh
 Piero Sraffa
 Ian Steedman
 Paul Sweezy

Cooperative economics
 Michael Albert
 Pat Devine
 Robin Hahnel
 Noreena Hertz
 Branko Horvat
 Edvard Kardelj
 David Schweickart
 Jaroslav Vanek

Neoclassical economists
 Enrico Barone
 Oskar Lange
 Abba Lerner
 Alfred Marshall
 David McMullen
 Alec Nove
 Andreas G. Papandreou
 Fred M. Taylor
 Léon Walras

Institutional economists
 Thorstein Veblen

See also
 Classical economics
 List of economists
 List of Marxian economists
 Marxian economics
 Production for use
 Socialism
 Socialist economics

Footnotes

Economists
Marxism
Schools of economic thought
Lists of economists